The 1999–2000 Toto Cup Artzit was the 1st time the cup was being contested as a competition for the third tier in the Israeli football league system. 

The competition was won by Hapoel Ramat Gan, who had beaten Hapoel Ra'anana 5–4 in the final.

Competition format
As 1999–2000 Liga Artzit was composed of 12 teams, and as 4 teams, Hapoel Ashdod, Beitar Tel Aviv, Sektzia Nes Tziona and Hapoel Lod were not allowed to compete since their budget was not approved, the remaining 8 clubs played the competition as a straight knock-out tournament, with the quarter-finals being played over two legs.

Results

Quarter-finals

|}

 Hapoel Tayibe was not allowed to play due to violation of arbitration judgement.

Semifinals

Final

See also
 Toto Cup
 1999–2000 Liga Artzit
 1999–2000 Toto Cup Al

External links
 Israel Cups 1999/2000 rsssf.com

Toto Cup Artzit
Toto Cup Artzit
Israel Toto Cup Artzit